Goodbye My Fancy may refer to:

"Good-Bye My Fancy!", 1891 American poem in second annex to Walt Whitman's Leaves of Grass
Goodbye, My Fancy, 1948 American comedy play by Fay Kanin
Goodbye, My Fancy (film), 1951 American romantic comedy based on Kanin's play